Gullane railway station served the village of Gullane in Scotland. It was served by the Aberlady, Gullane and North Berwick railway. This line diverged from the North British Railway Main Line at Aberlady Junction, east of the current Longniddry station.

History
The line was intended to reach  and thereby provide a route to North Berwick, but this section was never constructed and Gullane remained as the terminus.

The station had one platform on the north side of a loop that allowed the engine to run around. There were three sidings behind the platform forming a goods yard able to accommodate most types of goods including livestock; it was equipped with a two ton crane. There was an engine shed and a signal box.

The line and station were absorbed by the North British Railway on 6 August 1900. The station then passed on to the London and North Eastern Railway (LNER) during the Grouping of 1923. That company withdrew passenger services nine years later, although the line was still open to freight until 1964.

The station building was used by LNER as a camping apartment from 1935. The Scottish Region continued this use of the buildings, sometimes marketed as Camping Cottages in the 1950s and up to the line closing in 1964. The station was also the location of a camping coach from 1956 to 1964.

The site today
The houses of Muirfeld Drive and Muirfield Station are built on the old site of Gullane railway station. A railway hotel, the Marine, was built in 1900 and was  the main building of the Scottish Fire Service training school.
This was closed in March 2015 and converted to housing.

References

Notes

Sources

Further reading

External links 
 RAILSCOT on Aberlady, Gullane and North Berwick Railway

Disused railway stations in East Lothian
Former North British Railway stations
Railway stations in Great Britain opened in 1898
Railway stations in Great Britain closed in 1932
1898 establishments in Scotland
1932 disestablishments in Scotland